Robert Nozick (November 16, 1938 – January 23, 2002) was an American philosopher. He held the Joseph Pellegrino University Professorship at Harvard University, and was president of the American Philosophical Association. He is best known for his books Anarchy, State, and Utopia (1974), a libertarian answer to John Rawls' A Theory of Justice (1971), in which Nozick also presented his own theory of utopia as one in which people can freely choose the rules of the society they enter into, and Philosophical Explanations (1981), which included his counterfactual theory of knowledge. His other work involved ethics, decision theory, philosophy of mind, metaphysics and epistemology. His final work before his death, Invariances (2001), introduced his theory of evolutionary cosmology, by which he argues invariances, and hence objectivity itself, emerged through evolution across possible worlds.

Personal life
Nozick was born in Brooklyn to a family of Jewish descent.  His mother was born Sophie Cohen, and his father was a Jew from a Russian shtetl who had been born with the name Cohen and who ran a small business.

Nozick attended the public schools in Brooklyn. He was then educated at Columbia University (A.B. 1959, summa cum laude), where he studied with Sidney Morgenbesser; Princeton University (PhD 1963) under Carl Hempel; and at Oxford University as a Fulbright Scholar (1963–1964). At one point, he joined the YPSL. In addition, at Columbia he founded the local chapter of the Student League for Industrial Democracy which in 1960 changed its name to Students for a Democratic Society.

After receiving his undergraduate degree in 1959, he married Barbara Fierer. They had two children, Emily and David. The Nozicks eventually divorced; Nozick later married the poet Gjertrud Schnackenberg. Nozick died in 2002 after a prolonged struggle with stomach cancer. He was interred at Mount Auburn Cemetery in Cambridge, Massachusetts.

Career and works

Political philosophy

For Anarchy, State, and Utopia (1974) Nozick received a National Book Award in the category Philosophy and Religion.
There, Nozick argues that only a minimal state limited to the narrow functions of protection against "force, fraud, theft, and administering courts of law" could be justified, as any more extensive state would violate people's rights. For Nozick, a distribution of goods is just if brought about by free exchange among consenting adults from a just starting position, even if large inequalities subsequently emerge from the process.

Nozick challenged the partial conclusion of John Rawls's Second Principle of Justice of his A Theory of Justice, that "social and economic inequalities are to be arranged so that they are to be of greatest benefit to the least-advantaged members of society." Anarchy, State, and Utopia claims a heritage from John Locke's Second Treatise on Government and seeks to ground itself upon a natural law doctrine, but reaches some importantly different conclusions from Locke himself in several ways. Nozick appealed also to the Kantian idea that people should be treated as end in themselves (what he termed 'separatedness of persons'), not merely as a means to an end.

Most controversially, and unlike Locke and Kant, Nozick argued that consistent application of self-ownership and non-aggression principle would allow and regard as valid consensual or non-coercive enslavement contracts between adults. He rejected the notion of inalienable rights advanced by Locke and most contemporary capitalist-oriented libertarian academics, writing in Anarchy, State, and Utopia that the typical notion of a "free system" would allow adults to voluntarily enter into non-coercive slave contracts.

Epistemology
In Philosophical Explanations (1981), which received the Phi Beta Kappa Society's Ralph Waldo Emerson Award, Nozick provided novel accounts of knowledge, free will, personal identity, the nature of value, and the meaning of life. He also put forward an epistemological system which attempted to deal with both the Gettier problem and those posed by skepticism. This highly influential argument eschewed justification as a necessary requirement for knowledge.

Nozick's four conditions for S's knowing that P were (S=Subject / P=Proposition):

 P is true
 S believes that P
 If it were the case that (not-P), S would not believe that P
 If it were the case that P, S would believe that P

Nozick's third and fourth conditions are counterfactuals. He called this the "tracking theory" of knowledge. Nozick believed the counterfactual conditionals bring out an important aspect of our intuitive grasp of knowledge: For any given fact, the believer's method must reliably track the truth despite varying relevant conditions. In this way, Nozick's theory is similar to reliabilism. Due to certain counterexamples that could otherwise be raised against these counterfactual conditions, Nozick specified that:

If P weren't the case and S were to use M to arrive at a belief whether or not P, then S wouldn't believe, via M, that P.
If P were the case and S were to use M to arrive at a belief whether or not P, then S would believe, via M, that P.

Where M stands for the method by which S came to arrive at a belief whether or not P.

A major criticism of Nozick's theory of knowledge is his rejection of the  principle of deductive closure.  This principle states that if S knows X and S knows that X implies Y, then S knows Y.  Nozick's truth tracking conditions do not allow for the principle of deductive closure.  Nozick believes that the truth tracking conditions are more fundamental to human intuition than the principle of deductive closure.

Later books
The Examined Life (1989), pitched to a broader public, explores love, death, faith, reality, and the meaning of life. According to Stephen Metcalf, Nozick expresses serious misgivings about capitalist libertarianism, going so far as to reject much of the foundations of the theory on the grounds that personal freedom can sometimes only be fully actualized via a collectivist politics and that wealth is at times justly redistributed via taxation to protect the freedom of the many from the potential tyranny of an overly selfish and powerful few. Nozick suggests that citizens who are opposed to wealth redistribution which fund programs they object to, should be able to opt out by supporting alternative government approved charities with an added 5% surcharge.

However, Jeff Riggenbach has noted that in an interview conducted in July 2001, he stated that he had never stopped self-identifying as a libertarian. Roderick Long reported that in his last book, Invariances, "[Nozick] identified voluntary cooperation as the 'core principle' of ethics, maintaining that the duty not to interfere with another person's 'domain of choice' is '[a]ll that any society should (coercively) demand'; higher levels of ethics, involving positive benevolence, represent instead a 'personal ideal' that should be left to 'a person's own individual choice and development.' And that certainly sounds like an attempt to embrace libertarianism all over again. My own view is that Nozick's thinking about these matters evolved over time and that what he wrote at any given time was an accurate reflection of what he was thinking at that time." Furthermore, Julian Sanchez reported that "Nozick always thought of himself as a libertarian in a broad sense, right up to his final days, even as his views became somewhat less 'hardcore.'"

The Nature of Rationality (1993) presents a theory of practical reason that attempts to embellish notoriously spartan classical decision theory.

Socratic Puzzles (1997) is a collection of papers that range in topic from Ayn Rand and Austrian economics to animal rights. A thesis claims that "social ties are deeply interconnected with vital parts of Nozick's later philosophy", citing these two works as a development of The Examined Life.

His last production, Invariances (2001), applies insights from physics and biology to questions of objectivity in such areas as the nature of necessity and moral value.

Utilitarianism
Nozick created the thought experiment of the "utility monster" to show that average utilitarianism could lead to a situation where the needs of the vast majority were sacrificed for one individual. He also wrote a version of what was essentially a previously known thought experiment, the experience machine, in an attempt to show that ethical hedonism was false. Nozick asked us to imagine that "superduper neuropsychologists" have figured out a way to stimulate a person's brain to induce pleasurable experiences. We would not be able to tell that these experiences were not real. He asks us, if we were given the choice, would we choose a machine-induced experience of a wonderful life over real life? Nozick says no, then asks whether we have reasons not to plug into the machine and concludes that since we desire to be really impressed by things and not just feel something pleasurable, it does not seem to be rational to plug in, hence ethical hedonism must be false.

Philosophical method
Nozick was notable for the exploratory style of his philosophizing and for his methodological ecumenism. Often content to raise tantalizing philosophical possibilities and then leave judgment to the reader, Nozick was also notable for drawing from literature outside of philosophy (e.g., economics, physics, evolutionary biology).

Invariances 
In his 2001 work, Invariances, Nozick introduces his theory of truth, in which he leans towards a deflationary theory of truth, but argues that objectivity arises through being invariant under various transformations. For instance, space-time is a significant objective fact because an interval involving both temporal and spatial separation is invariant, whereas no simpler interval involving only temporal or only spatial separation is invariant under Lorentz transformations. Nozick argues that invariances, and hence objectivity itself, emerged through a theory of evolutionary cosmology across possible worlds.

Bibliography
 Anarchy, State, and Utopia (1974) 
 Philosophical Explanations (1981) 
 The Examined Life (1989) 
 The Nature of Rationality (1993/1995) 
 Socratic Puzzles (1997) 
 Invariances: The Structure of the Objective World (2001/2003)

See also

 American philosophy
 Liberalism
 List of American philosophers
 List of liberal theorists
 A Theory of Justice: The Musical! – in which a fictional Nozick is one of the characters

Notes

Further reading

 
 Frankel Paul, Ellen; Fred D. Miller, Jr. and Jeffrey Paul (eds.), (2004) Natural Rights Liberalism from Locke to Nozick, Cambridge University Press, 
 
 Mack, Eric (2014) Robert Nozick's Political Philosophy, Stanford Encyclopedia of Philosophy, June 22, 2014.
 Robinson, Dave & Groves, Judy (2003). Introducing Political Philosophy. Icon Books. .
 Schaefer, David Lewis (2008) Robert Nozick and the Coast of Utopia, The New York Sun, April 30, 2008.
 Wolff, Jonathan (1991), Robert Nozick: Property, Justice, and the Minimal State. Polity Press.

External links

 
 Robert Nozick: Political Philosophy – overview of Nozick in the Internet Encyclopedia of Philosophy
 

1938 births
2002 deaths
20th-century American male writers
20th-century American non-fiction writers
20th-century American philosophers
21st-century American male writers
21st-century American non-fiction writers
21st-century American philosophers
American ethicists
American libertarians
American logicians
American male non-fiction writers
American people of Russian-Jewish descent
American political philosophers
American political writers
Analytic philosophers
Burials at Mount Auburn Cemetery
Center for Advanced Study in the Behavioral Sciences fellows
Columbia College (New York) alumni
Critical theorists
Critics of Objectivism (Ayn Rand)
Deaths from cancer in Massachusetts
Deaths from stomach cancer
Epistemologists
Harvard University faculty
Jewish American writers
Jewish philosophers
Kantian philosophers
Libertarian theorists
Mathematicians from New York (state)
Metaphysicians
National Book Award winners
People from Belmont, Massachusetts
People from Brooklyn
Philosophers of economics
Philosophers of law
Philosophers of mind
 
Political philosophers
Princeton University alumni
Right-libertarianism
Social philosophers
Writers from New York (state)
Presidents of the American Philosophical Association
Corresponding Fellows of the British Academy
Fulbright alumni